Geoff McNaughton (17 October 1916 – 16 July 2008) was a former Australian rules footballer who played with Melbourne in the Victorian Football League (VFL).

Notes

External links 

1916 births
Australian rules footballers from Victoria (Australia)
Melbourne Football Club players
Melbourne High School Old Boys Football Club players
2008 deaths